Junk Theatre is the second studio album by Australian folk-rock band Things of Stone and Wood. The album was released in March 1995 and debuted and peaked at number 8 on the ARIA Charts.

Reception

Jonathan Lewis from AllMusic said "While similar in many ways to their debut The Yearning, this album had a harder musical edge, often more rock than folk... Again, social commentary was Things of Stone and Wood's main source of inspiration, although on Junk Theatre there were much fewer specific Australian references. Everything from racism to the negative effects of television are touched upon."

Track listing

Charts

Release history

References

1995 albums
Things of Stone and Wood albums